In the mathematical field of Riemannian geometry, the fundamental theorem of Riemannian geometry states that on any Riemannian manifold (or pseudo-Riemannian manifold) there is a unique affine connection that is torsion-free and metric-compatible, called the Levi-Civita connection or Riemannian connection of the given metric. Because it is canonically defined by such properties, often this connection is automatically used when given a metric.

Statement of the theorem
Fundamental theorem of Riemannian Geometry. Let  be a Riemannian manifold (or pseudo-Riemannian manifold). Then there is a unique connection  which satisfies the following conditions:
It is further equivalent to require that the connection is induced by a principal bundle connection on the orthonormal frame bundle.

There are alternative characterizations.

An extension of the fundamental theorem states that given a pseudo-Riemannian manifold there is a unique connection preserving the metric tensor, with any given vector-valued 2-form as its torsion. The difference between an arbitrary connection (with torsion) and the corresponding Levi-Civita connection is the contorsion tensor.

The fundamental theorem asserts both existence and uniqueness of a certain connection, which is called the Levi-Civita connection or Riemannian connection. However, the existence result is extremely direct, as the connection in question may be explicitly defined by either the second Christoffel identity or Koszul formula as obtained in the proofs below. This explicit definition expresses the Levi-Civita connection in terms of the metric and its first derivatives. As such, if the metric is -times continuously differentiable, then the Levi-Civita connection is -times continuously differentiable.

The Levi-Civita connection can also be characterized in other ways, for instance via the Palatini variation of the Einstein–Hilbert action.

Proof of the theorem
The proof of the theorem can be presented in various ways. Here the proof is first given in the language of coordinates and Christoffel symbols, and then in the coordinate-free language of covariant derivatives. Regardless of the presentation, the idea is to use the metric-compatibility and torsion-freeness conditions to obtain a direct formula for any connection that is both metric-compatible and torsion-free. This establishes the uniqueness claim in the fundamental theorem. To establish the existence claim, it must be directly checked that the formula obtained does define a connection as desired.

Local coordinates
Here the Einstein summation convention will be used, which is to say that an index repeated as both subscript and superscript is being summed over all values. Recall that, relative to a local chart, a connection is given by  smooth functions

with

Written in terms of local coordinates, this is equivalent to

Similarly, the condition of metric-compatibility is equivalent to the condition

In this way, it is seen that the conditions of torsion-freeness and metric-compatibility can be viewed as a linear system of equations for the connection, in which the coefficients and 'right-hand side' of the system are given by the metric and its first derivative. The fundamental theorem of Riemannian geometry can be viewed as saying that this linear system has a unique solution. This is seen via the following computation:

in which the metric-compatibility condition is used three times for the first equality and the torsion-free condition is used three times for the second equality. The resulting formula is sometimes known as the first Christoffel identity. It can be contracted with the inverse of the metric, to find the second Christoffel identity:

This proves the uniqueness of a torsion-free and metric-compatible condition; that is, any such connection must be given by the above formula. To prove the existence, it must be checked that the above formula defines a connection that is torsion-free and metric-compatible. This can be done directly.

Invariant formulation
The above proof can also be expressed in terms of vector fields. Torsion-freeness refers to the condition that

and metric-compatibility refers to the condition that

The computation previously done in local coordinates can be written as

The equations displayed above can be rearranged to produce the Koszul formula or identity

This is a consequence of the non-degeneracy of the metric.

Notes

References

 

 

 

 

Articles containing proofs
Connection (mathematics)
Riemannian geometry
Riemannian manifolds
Theorems in Riemannian geometry